Danielithosia consimilis is a moth of the family Erebidae. It is found in China (Guangdong).

The forewings are unicolorous light yellow. The hindwings are slightly darker than the forewing, with darker apical an 
external margins.

References

External links

Moths described in 2012
Endemic fauna of China
Lithosiina